C Bear and Jamal is a German-American animated musical comedy children's television series that originally aired on the Fox Kids programming block from 1996 to 1997. It centers on an elementary school-aged boy named Jamal, whose constant companion was "C Bear", an orange hip-hop teddy bear who raps. Film Roman co-produced the show.

Characters 
 Jamal Harrison Wingo (Arthur Reggie III) - Jamal is a trustful, 9-year-old (later 10-year-old) African-American boy who always seems to be in a mission, but has C Bear to help him when he's in trouble.
 C-Bear (Tone Loc) - C Bear is a wise rapping teddy bear with a hip-hop look. He comes back to life when Jamal is around and is always ready to give him advice. He has the power to take with Jamal on wacky adventures.
 Hawthorne Wingo (George L. Wallace) - Hawthorne is the father of Jamal, who is always in desire and often questions Jamal on why he still keeps C Bear. It's unknown what happened to Hawthorne's wife.
 Grandma (Dawnn Lewis) - Jamal's grandmother, who cooks the food for her family and is very nice to everyone.
 Grandpa (Darryl Sivad) - Jamal's grandfather, who is bald and almost never leaves his chair.
 Maya (Kim Fields) - Jamal's love interest, who is very loud but dislikes it when she is corrected on that. She is also very smart.
 Big Chill (Aries Spears) - Jamal's fat friend, who is always hungry and sounds like he has a cold. Whenever he's coming in a room he'll say "the b-i-g c-h-i double l is in the hizzouse". He's also been held back a few times.
 Kwame (Aries Spears) Jamal's best friend, who is dressed in African clothes and believes in "power to the people" and often calls things "conspiracies by 'The Man'" when he is displeased.
 Chipster (Jeannie Elias) - Jamal's Caucasian friend, who likes to make his friends laugh and never thinks of himself as weird.
 Kim (Margaret Cho) - Jamal's Asian friend, who is always with Maya and hates to see her friends being chosen on.
 Javier (Paul Rodríguez) - Jamal's Latino friend, who doesn't tend to say mean things.

Episodes

Series overview

Season 1 (1996)

Season 2 (1996–97)

Credits 
 Executive Producers: Tone Loc, Phil Roman, Margaret Loesch
 Producer: Bob Richardson
 Story Editors: L. Rice, Al Sonya
 Voice Director: Debbie Allen
 Executives in Charge of Production: Bill Schultz, Anne Luiting
 Studio Production Manager: Lolee Aries
 Manager of Foreign Production: Kenneth T. Ito
 Casting: Eileen Mack Knight
 Director of Creative Development: Guy Vasilovich
 Directors: David Brain, Vincent Davis, Brian Hogan, Emory Myrick
 Music by: Kurt Farquhar
 Main Title Song Written and Performed by: Tone Loc
 Character Design: Bruce W. Smith
 Layout Design: Charles Payne, Cliff Vorhees
 Prop Design: Gary Hoffman, Jim Schumann
 Painting: Deborah Mark, Belle Norman, Elizabeth Reed, Cookie Tricarico
 Art Director: Brad Landreth
 Backgrounds: Nathan Chew
 Layouts: Nathan Chew
 Color Key Supervisor: Phyllis Craig
 Storyboards: Robert Boyle, Sandra Frame, Gary Hoffman, Brian Hogan, Chris Hubbard, Jay Lender, Scott Shaw!
 Picture Editors: Don Barrozo, Lee Harting
 Post Production Sound Services: Advantage Audio, Inc.
 Sound Recording Mixers: Melissa Gentry-Ellis, Ray Leonard, Jim Hodson
 Sound Effects Design: Michael Warner
 Music Editor: Fil Brown
 Track Department: Peter Aries
 Creative Producer: Swinton O. Scott III
 Creative Consultants: Earl Richey Jones, Todd R. Jones, Bruce W. Smith
 Creative Concepts: Frankyln Ajaye, Barry Douglas
 Executive in Charge of Production for Fox Kids: Barney Gilmore
 Production Accountant: Kyle C. Hammans
 Production Managers: Barbara Cordova, Stephanie Elliott
 Assistant Film Editor: Kurtis Kunsak
 Negative Cutting: D and A Negative Cutting, Inc., Tim Heyen
 Telecine: Editel, Complete Post, Inc., Sunset Post
 Operator: Larry Field
 Post Production Director: Barbara Beck
 Post Production Supervisor: Noel Quinn-Roman
 Overseas Supervisor: Russell Crispin

Home video releases 
Xenon Entertainment Group released every episode of the show on VHS and DVD in 2000.

As of January 2022, C Bear and Jamal can be streamed on The Roku Channel.

References

External links 

 - Fox Kids

 

1990s American animated television series
1990s American black cartoons
1990s American musical comedy television series
1996 American television series debuts
1997 American television series endings
1990s German animated television series
1996 German television series debuts
1997 German television series endings
American children's animated comedy television series
American children's animated fantasy television series
American children's animated musical television series
German children's animated comedy television series
German children's animated fantasy television series
German children's animated musical television series
Hip hop television
Fictional African-American people
Fox Broadcasting Company original programming
English-language television shows
Fox Kids
Television shows set in Los Angeles
Television series by Film Roman
Animated television series about bears
Animated television series about children